John Harris Baker (February 28, 1832 – October 21, 1915) was a United States representative from Indiana and a United States district judge of the United States District Court for the District of Indiana.

Education and career

Born on February 28, 1832, in Parma, Monroe County, New York, Baker moved with his parents to what is now Fulton County, Ohio, where he attended and later taught in the common schools. He received an Artium Magister degree in 1879 from Wesleyan University in Delaware, Ohio. He read law in Adrian, Michigan and was admitted to the bar in 1857. He entered private practice in Goshen, Indiana from 1857 to 1875. He unsuccessfully challenged the election of Charles Lefferts Murray to the Indiana Senate in 1863, but his challenge failed and he was never seated, although he was paid as if he had been a state senator.

Congressional service

Baker was elected as a Republican from Indiana's 13th congressional district to the United States House of Representatives of the 44th, 45th and 46th United States Congresses, serving from March 4, 1875, to March 3, 1881. He declined to be a candidate for renomination in 1880. Baker resumed private practice in Goshen from 1881 to 1892. He was a delegate to the 1888 Republican National Convention.

Federal judicial service

Baker was nominated by President Benjamin Harrison on March 24, 1892, to a seat on the United States District Court for the District of Indiana vacated by Judge William Allen Woods. He was confirmed by the United States Senate on March 29, 1892, and received his commission the same day. His service terminated on December 8, 1902, due to his retirement.

Retirement and death

Following his retirement, Baker resided in Goshen. He died on October 21, 1915, in Goshen. He is interred in Oakridge Cemetery in Goshen.

Family

Baker was the brother of Lucien Baker, a United States senator from Kansas.

References

Sources
 "Memorial Meeting of the State Bar Association of Indiana in Memory of Hon. John H. Baker," in Report of the Twentieth Annual Meeting of the State Bar Association of Indiana, Held at Lafayette, Indiana, July 13 and 14, 1916. Indianapolis: Harrington and Folger for the Association, n.d. [1916].
 
 
 

1832 births
1915 deaths
People from Parma, New York
Republican Party members of the United States House of Representatives from Indiana
Judges of the United States District Court for the District of Indiana
United States federal judges appointed by Benjamin Harrison
United States federal judges admitted to the practice of law by reading law
19th-century American judges
People from Elkhart County, Indiana
People from Fulton County, Ohio
19th-century American politicians
Wesleyan University alumni